Kenji Kawaguchi is a Japanese mixed martial artist. He competed in the Welterweight division.

Career

Vale Tudo Japan
After a 10–0–4 career in Shooto, Kawaguchi represented the promotion in the event Vale Tudo Japan in July 1994, where he was pitted against French karateka Jan Lomulder. Kawaguchi charged for a takedown, but Lomulder kept himself standing by grabbing the ring ropes and scored multiple strikes on the back of Kawaguchi's head, both being legal tactics under that ruleset. Kawaguchi eventually took him down, only for Lomulder to answer with rabbit punches that forced the wrestler out of the ring. A controversial moment happened when Kawaguchi tried to return to the ring, as the referee didn't stop the action, meaning Lomulder could freely score soccer kicks and stomps while he did so.

The Shooto wrestler repeated the takedown, but Lomulder grabbed the ropes again and landed multiple elbow strikes to the back of the head, and then followed with and more soccer kicks and stomps. After a restart, Kawaguchi tried to come back with a kneebar, but Lomulder blocked the technique and landed a heavy kick on the face, leading the referee to stop the match.

Kawaguchi returned to Vale Tudo Japan in 1995, where he submitted American fighter Tommy Walkingstick via armbar.

Three years after their first encounter in Vale Tudo Japan, Lomulder and Kawaguchi rematched in the Vale Tudo Japan edition of 1997. This time, the match lasted three rounds, and it saw the Japanese shoot wrestler eventually taking Lomulder down and executing a rear naked choke for the victory.

Kawaguchi's last VTJ appearance was in 1998, when he fought Russian mixed martial artist Vladimir Matyushenko and lost by KO.

Championships and accomplishments
Shooto
Shooto Light Heavyweight Championship (One time)
Four successful title defenses

Mixed martial arts record

|-
| Loss
| align=center| 14–7–4
| Yuki Kondo
| KO (punch)
| Pancrase: 271
| 
| align=center| 1
| align=center| 3:52
| Tokyo, Japan
|Open Weight bout.
|-
| Win
| align=center| 14–6–4
| Deividas Petrauskas
| TKO (punches)
| Shooto: The Devilock
| 
| align=center| 1
| align=center| 2:05
| Tokyo, Japan
| 
|-
| Loss
| align=center| 13–6–4
| Carlos Newton
| Submission (armbar)
| Shooto - 10th Anniversary Event
| 
| align=center| 1
| align=center| 5:00
| Yokohama, Kanagawa, Japan
| 
|-
| Loss
| align=center| 13–5–4
| Vladimir Matyushenko
| KO (punches)
| Vale Tudo Japan 1998
| 
| align=center| 1
| align=center| 3:10
| Urayasu, Chiba, Japan
| 
|-
| Win
| align=center| 13–4–4
| Ante Jurisic
| Submission (heel hook)
| Shooto - Las Grandes Viajes 4
| 
| align=center| 2
| align=center| 0:35
| Tokyo, Japan
| 
|-
| Loss
| align=center| 12–4–4
| Masanori Suda
| Submission (armbar)
| Shooto - Las Grandes Viajes 2
| 
| align=center| 3
| align=center| 1:08
| Tokyo, Japan
| 
|-
| Win
| align=center| 12–3–4
| Jan Lomulder
| Submission (rear-naked choke)
| Vale Tudo Japan 1997
| 
| align=center| 3
| align=center| 3:49
| Urayasu, Chiba, Japan
| 
|-
| Loss
| align=center| 11–3–4
| Erik Paulson
| Submission (toe hold)
| Shooto - Vale Tudo Junction 3
| 
| align=center| 3
| align=center| 1:23
| Tokyo, Japan
| 
|-
| Win
| align=center| 11–2–4
| Tommy Walkingstick
| Submission (armbar)
| Vale Tudo Japan 1995
| 
| align=center| 1
| align=center| 6:29
| Tokyo, Japan
| 
|-
| Loss
| align=center| 10–2–4
| Erik Paulson
| Technical Submission (armbar)
| Shooto - Vale Tudo Access 2
| 
| align=center| 2
| align=center| 1:03
| Tokyo, Japan
| 
|-
| Loss
| align=center| 10–1–4
| Jan Lomulder
| TKO (soccer kick)
| Vale Tudo Japan 1994
| 
| align=center| 1
| align=center| 2:59
| Urayasu, Chiba, Japan
| 
|-
| Win
| align=center| 10–0–4
| Yasunori Okuda
| Submission (guillotine choke)
| Shooto - Shooto
| 
| align=center| 1
| align=center| 2:55
| Tokyo, Japan
| 
|-
| Win
| align=center| 9–0–4
| Tomokazu Fukaya
| Submission (kneebar)
| Shooto - Shooto
| 
| align=center| 1
| align=center| 0:32
| Tokyo, Japan
| 
|-
| Draw
| align=center| 8–0–4
| Satoshi Honma
| Draw
| Shooto - Shooto
| 
| align=center| 5
| align=center| 3:00
| Tokyo, Japan
| 
|-
| Win
| align=center| 8–0–3
| Manabu Yamada
| Submission (kneebar)
| Shooto - Shooto
| 
| align=center| 1
| align=center| 0:36
| Tokyo, Japan
| 
|-
| Win
| align=center| 7–0–3
| Satoshi Honma
| Decision (unanimous)
| Shooto - Shooto
| 
| align=center| 5
| align=center| 3:00
| Osaka, Japan
| 
|-
| Draw
| align=center| 6–0–3
| Kazuhiro Kusayanagi
| Draw
| Shooto - Shooto
| 
| align=center| 5
| align=center| 3:00
| Tokyo, Japan
| 
|-
| Win
| align=center| 6–0–2
| Manabu Yamada
| Submission (kneebar)
| Shooto - Shooto
| 
| align=center| 1
| align=center| 0:58
| Tokyo, Japan
| 
|-
| Win
| align=center| 5–0–2
| Naoki Sakurada
| Submission (guillotine choke)
| Shooto - Shooto
| 
| align=center| 1
| align=center| 0:00
| Tokyo, Japan
| 
|-
| Win
| align=center| 4–0–2
| Yuji Ito
| KO (punches)
| Shooto - Shooto
| 
| align=center| 3
| align=center| 0:37
| Tokyo, Japan
| 
|-
| Draw
| align=center| 3–0–2
| Yasuto Sekishima
| Draw
| Shooto - Shooto
| 
| align=center| 5
| align=center| 3:00
| Tokyo, Japan
| 
|-
| Win
| align=center| 3–0–1
| Naoki Sakurada
| TKO (punches)
| Shooto - Shooto
| 
| align=center| 4
| align=center| 1:29
| Tokyo, Japan
| 
|-
| Win
| align=center| 2–0–1
| Mitsuo Fujikura
| Submission (armbar)
| Shooto - Shooto
| 
| align=center| 2
| align=center| 0:41
| Tokyo, Japan
| 
|-
| Draw
| align=center| 1–0–1
| Yuji Ito
| Draw
| Shooto - Shooto
| 
| align=center| 4
| align=center| 3:00
| Tokyo, Japan
| 
|-
| Win
| align=center| 1–0
| Tadashi Yokoyama
| Submission (kneebar)
| Shooto - Shooto
| 
| align=center| 1
| align=center| 0:00
| Tokyo, Japan
|

See also
List of male mixed martial artists

References

External links
 
 Kenji Kawaguchi at mixedmartialarts.com
 Kenji Kawaguchi at fightmatrix.com

Japanese male mixed martial artists
Welterweight mixed martial artists
Living people
Year of birth missing (living people)